Icarina is a genus of beetles in the family Buprestidae, containing the following species:
 Icarina alata (Laporte & Gory, 1837)
 Icarina cottae (Fairmaire, 1902)
 Icarina elongata (Kerremans, 1893)

References

Buprestidae genera